South Alloa is a small village which lies in the far north of the Falkirk council area of Scotland. The village is on the south bank of the River Forth where the river empties and widens to form the Firth of Forth.

It lies just inside the council boundary line between Falkirk and Stirling councils.

The village lies off the A905 road between Dunmore and Throsk. The village is at a former ferry crossing point across the River Forth to Alloa. Between 1850 and 1885 South Alloa railway station was the terminus of a line originally built by Scottish Central Railway.

The village had 112 residents in 2011, a 49% increase since the 2001 census.

See also 
List of places in Falkirk council area

References

External links

Vision of Britain - South Alloa
Railbrit - South Alloa Branch

Villages in Falkirk (council area)